Agincourt is a commune in the Meurthe-et-Moselle department in northeastern France.

Population

Inhabitants are called Agincourtois.

See also
Communes of the Meurthe-et-Moselle department
Commune of Azincourt, site of the Battle of Agincourt
The Toronto neighborhood of Agincourt, named for Azincourt but spelled "Agincourt."

References

Communes of Meurthe-et-Moselle